Eulima anonyma is a species of sea snail, a marine gastropod mollusk in the family Eulimidae. The species is one of a number within the genus Eulima.

Description
The shell measures approximately 4 mm in length.

Distribution
This species occurs in the following locations:
 Bay of Biscay
 European waters (ERMS scope)

References

 Gofas, S.; Le Renard, J.; Bouchet, P. (2001). Mollusca. in: Costello, M.J. et al. (eds), European Register of Marine Species: a check-list of the marine species in Europe and a bibliography of guides to their identification. Patrimoines Naturels. 50: 180-213
 ysoev A.V. (2014). Deep-sea fauna of European seas: An annotated species check-list of benthic invertebrates living deeper than 2000 m in the seas bordering Europe. Gastropoda. Invertebrate Zoology. Vol.11. No.1: 134–155

External links
 Bouchet, P. & Warén, A. (1986). Revision of the Northeast Atlantic bathyal and abyssal Aclididae Eulimidae, Epitonidae (Mollusca, Gastropoda). Bollettino Malacologico. suppl. 2: 297-576
  Serge GOFAS, Ángel A. LUQUE, Joan Daniel OLIVER,José TEMPLADO & Alberto SERRA (2021) - The Mollusca of Galicia Bank (NE Atlantic Ocean); European Journal of Taxonomy 785: 1–114

anonyma
Gastropods described in 1986